Robert Wood "General" Johnson II (April 4, 1893 – January 30, 1968) was an American businessman. He was one of the sons of Robert Wood Johnson I, the co-founder of Johnson & Johnson. He turned the family business into one of the world's largest healthcare corporations.

Early life

Johnson was born in New Brunswick, New Jersey, on April 4, 1893. His father was Robert Wood Johnson I, co-founder of Johnson & Johnson, and his mother was Evangeline Brewster Armstrong Johnson. Johnson grew up with three siblings: Roberta Johnson, John Seward Johnson I, and Evangeline Johnson. When he was sixteen, their father died, leaving him an estate of $2,000,000. He attended the prestigious Rutgers Preparatory School before dropping out to start working full-time at Johnson & Johnson. This gave him an insight into the workings of the company for the rest of his life.

Career

Johnson became vice president at J&J in 1918. Johnson also had an abiding interest in politics, and served a term as the mayor of Highland Park, New Jersey from 1920 to 1922. He was elected president of Johnson & Johnson from 1932 to 1938, and became chairman of the board of J&J in 1938. Johnson also held a reserve commission in the U.S. Army Quartermaster Corps during the 1930s. At the outbreak of World War II, Johnson's work in identifying products needed by the war effort resulted in the Permacell division of J&J inventing duct tape for sealing ammunition boxes. J&J plant managers simply took their existing cloth medical adhesive tape, added a waterproof plastic layer with a more aggressive adhesive, and produced it in olive drab (OD) green to match the ammunition cans. During the war, J&J would become a major supplier for combat first aid kits and other military supplies. In 1941, Johnson started the Ethicon subsidiary.

In 1942, Johnson's reserve Army commission was activated, and he was promoted to the rank of brigadier general and assigned to the Ordnance Department.  That same year he was nominated by the Roosevelt administration to be vice-chairman of the board of the War Plants Corporation (WPC).  When the Smaller War Plants Corporation (SWPC) was established as a division of the WPC in June 1942, Johnson was named chairman of the board of the SWPC., which regulated wartime production of military goods and defense items in smaller defense plants and businesses (500 or fewer employees) dispersed throughout the U.S. economy. The SWPC made direct loans, encouraged commercial lenders to make credit available to small businesses, and advocated for small businesses with federal agencies and larger corporate enterprises.

During his tenure as chairman of the SWPC, Johnson personally oversaw war contracts assigned to more than 6,000 companies.  His tenure was a troubled one, and was marked by complaints from small businesses that they were not being awarded a significant portion of the most valuable wartime defense contracts.  During 1943, firms with under 100 employees were awarded 86,000 contracts, about 35% of the total number awarded (241,531), but worth only 3.5% of the total value ($35.3 million) of all contracts awarded by the SWPC.  Johnson responded by increasing the number of contracts to small businesses; however, instead of examining each company to determine what contribution each could make to the war effort, the SWPC began distributing contracts as a form of relief to prevent setbacks to small concerns with unused factory plant capacity.

As chairman of the SWPC and an Army general in the Ordnance Branch, Johnson had a tendency to overrule service branch requests for approval for production of specific military armament and ordnance items in favor of competing but less capable designs that could be made more rapidly or with lower material costs, freeing scarce but non-critical materials to small companies so that they could begin the transition to peacetime goods production.  This infuriated Johnson's military superiors in the War Department, who realized that the diversion of materials to peacetime production meant less factory capacity for new weapons and increased production of war materiel just as victory seemed to be within the grasp of Allied forces.  Unfazed, Johnson lost no opportunity in annoying his military superiors, frequently citing his business experience in support of his decisions.

Matters came to a head in the fall of 1943, when the entire Michigan regional division of the SWPC resigned in protest over the actions of the parent board, stating that the SWPC was "nothing more than a glorified publicity agency". Thomas W. Moss, regional director, announced in a press release that the resignations of the entire Michigan regional division board were included in a resolution sent to Johnson on September 29, 1943.  Two days later, on October 1, 1943, Johnson resigned his chairmanship of the SWPC, citing ill health as the reason for his sudden departure.

Johnson returned to his chairmanship at J&J in 1943. He was responsible for writing the Johnson & Johnson Credo, a statement of business principles which is carved into the wall of the company's New Jersey headquarters. The Credo states that the company's first responsibility is to “the doctors, nurses and patients, the mothers and all others who use our products”, and also sets out responsibilities to customers, suppliers, distributors, employees, communities and stockholders.

In 1962, Johnson, as chairman of the board of J&J, fired his nephew, John Seward Johnson II. In 1965, he fired his own son, Robert Wood Johnson III.

Personal life
In 1916, Johnson married Elizabeth Dixon Ross. They had one child: Robert Wood Johnson III. Their marriage lasted until 1928, when they began a two-year trial separation, ending in divorce. In 1930, Johnson married Margaret (Maggi) Shea. They had one child, Sheila Johnson Brutsch (born 1939). The couple divorced in 1943 after Bob met Evelyn Vernon. Maggi and Bob loved each other, but Maggi, a wise and kind woman who understood Bob's adulterous  personality, did not want to hold him back from any new happiness.

In 1944, Johnson married Evelyn Vernon (née Paynter), a former ballet dancer and a dance instructor who, like Johnson, was married when they met. This caused great difficulties, particularly for Evelyn, who came from a very upright middle-class background and was a strict Roman Catholic. Nevertheless, both divorced their spouses, and they married; Johnson's connections kept the matter out of the gossip columns. Johnson bought her clothes, jewels and a Rolls-Royce which sat outside Claridge's in London. If she went out walking, the Rolls-Royce would follow her, until she tired and wanted to get in to rest her feet. In latter years, Evelyn and Bob's union was blessed by the Catholic Church. This was arranged by Father Martin D'Arcy, a Jesuit at Farm Street Church in Mayfair, London. On his deathbed in 1968, Johnson would admit nobody to see him except "his Evie", who stayed by his bed and to whom he was devoted.

In 1928, Johnson had taken up residence at Morven in Princeton, New Jersey, the historic home of the Stockton family. It was converted into the New Jersey Governor's mansion after Johnson's lease on the property ended in 1945.  In 1946, Evie Johnson had an idea for a new showcase mansion in Princeton, and built 'Longleat' on sprawling grounds entered through grand gates with a one-mile drive up to the house. Evie was a bit of a social climber and had met the Marquess of Bath, who owned the Longleat "stately home" in Wiltshire, England, from which she borrowed the name.

Johnson died in 1968 at Roosevelt Hospital in New York City; he left the bulk of his $400,000,000 estate to the Robert Wood Johnson Foundation. His children already had been provided for, in a series of trusts. Johnson was buried at Elmwood Cemetery in North Brunswick, New Jersey.

Recognition
In 2008, Johnson was inducted into the New Jersey Hall of Fame.

References

External links

20th-century American businesspeople
Businesspeople in the pharmaceutical industry
People from New Brunswick, New Jersey
Robert Wood II
1893 births
1968 deaths
Mayors of places in New Jersey
People from Highland Park, New Jersey
People from Princeton, New Jersey
Businesspeople from New Jersey
Johnson & Johnson people
Quartermasters
American chairpersons of corporations
Rutgers Preparatory School alumni
20th-century American politicians
Burials at Elmwood Cemetery (North Brunswick, New Jersey)